Majapahit, also known as Wilwatikta, was a Javanese Hindu-Buddhist thalassocratic empire in Southeast Asia that was based on the island of Java (in modern-day Indonesia). It existed from 1293 to circa 1527 and reached its peak of glory during the era of Hayam Wuruk, whose reign from 1350 to 1389 was marked by conquests that extended throughout Southeast Asia. His achievement is also credited to his prime minister, Gajah Mada. According to the  written in 1365, Majapahit was an empire of 98 tributaries, stretching from Sumatra to New Guinea; consisting of present-day Indonesia, Singapore, Malaysia, Brunei, southern Thailand, Timor Leste, southwestern Philippines (in particular the Sulu Archipelago) although the scope of Majapahit sphere of influence is still the subject of debate among historians. The nature of Majapahit relations and influences upon its overseas vassals, and also its status as an empire are still provoking discussions.

Majapahit was one of the last major Hindu-Buddhist empires of the region and is considered to be one of the greatest and most powerful empires in the history of Indonesia and Southeast Asia. It is sometimes seen as the precedent for Indonesia's modern boundaries. Its influence extended beyond the modern territory of Indonesia and has been the subject of many studies.

Etymology

The name Majapahit derives from local Javanese, meaning "bitter maja". German orientalist Berthold Laufer suggested that maja came from the Javanese name of Aegle marmelos, an Indonesian tree. The name originally referred to the area in and around Trowulan, the cradle of Majapahit, which was linked to the establishment of a village in Tarik timberland by Raden Wijaya. It was said that the workers clearing the Tarik timberland encountered some bael trees and consumed its bitter-tasting fruit which then gave its name to the village. It is a common practice in Java to name an area, a village or settlement with the most conspicuous or abundant tree or fruit species found in that region. In ancient Java, it is common to refer to the kingdom with its capital's name. Majapahit (sometimes also spelled Mojopait) is also known by other names: Wilwatikta (translation in Sanskrit), although sometimes the natives refer to their kingdom as Bhumi Jawa or Mandala Jawa instead.

Historiography
Little physical evidence of Majapahit remains, and some details of the history are rather abstract. Nevertheless, local Javanese people did not forget Majapahit completely, as Mojopait is mentioned vaguely in Babad Tanah Jawi, a Javanese chronicle composed in the 18th century. Majapahit did produce physical evidence: the main ruins dating from the Majapahit period are clustered in the Trowulan area, which was the royal capital of the kingdom. The Trowulan archaeological site was first documented in the 19th century by Sir Thomas Stamford Raffles, Lieutenant-Governor of British Java of the East India Company from 1811 to 1816. He reported the existence of "ruins of temples ... scattered about the country for many miles", and referred to Trowulan as "this pride of Java".

By the early 20th century, Dutch colonial historians began to study old Javanese and Balinese literature to explore the past of their colony. Two primary sources were available to them: the Pararaton "Book of Kings" manuscript was written in the Kawi language after 1481, and Nagarakretagama (Desawarnaña) was composed in Kawi in 1365. Pararaton focuses on Ken Arok, the founder of Singhasari, but includes a number of shorter narrative fragments about the formation of Majapahit. The Nagarakretagama is an old Javanese eulogy written during the Majapahit golden age under the reign of Hayam Wuruk, after which some events are covered narratively. The Dutch acquired the manuscript in 1894 during their military expedition against the Cakranegara royal house of Lombok. There are also some inscriptions in Kawi and Chinese.

The Javanese sources incorporate some poetic mythological elements and scholars such as Cornelis Christiaan Berg, an Indies-born Dutch naturalist, have considered the entire historical record to be not a record of the past, but a supernatural means by which the future can be determined. Most scholars do not accept this view, as the historical record corresponds with Chinese materials that could not have had similar intention. The list of rulers and details of the state structure show no sign of being invented.

The Chinese historical sources on Majapahit mainly acquired from the chronicles of the Yuan and following Ming dynasty. The Chinese accounts on Majapahit are mainly owed to the Ming admiral Zheng He's reports during the his visit to Majapahit between 1405 and 1432. Zheng He's translator Ma Huan wrote a detailed description of Majapahit and where the king of Java lived. The report was composed and collected in Yingya Shenglan, which provides valuable insight on the culture, customs, and also various social and economic aspects of Chao-Wa (Java) during Majapahit period.

The Trowulan archaeological area has become the centre for the study of Majapahit history. The aerial and satellite imagery has revealed an extensive network of canals crisscrossing the Majapahit capital. Recent archaeological findings from April 2011 indicate the Majapahit capital was much larger than previously believed after some artefacts were uncovered.

History

Formation
After defeating the Melayu Kingdom in Sumatra in 1290, Singhasari became the most powerful kingdom in the region. Kublai Khan, the Khagan of the Mongol Empire and the Emperor of the Mongol-led Yuan dynasty of China, challenged Singhasari by sending emissaries demanding tribute. Kertanegara of Singhasari refused to pay the tribute, insulted Kublai's envoy, and challenged the Khan instead. In response, Kublai Khan sent a massive expedition of 1000 ships to Java in 1293.

Mongol invasion

By that time, Jayakatwang, the Adipati (Duke) of Kediri, a vassal state of Singhasari, had usurped and killed Kertanagara. After being pardoned by Jayakatwang with the aid of Madura's regent Arya Wiraraja, Kertanegara's son-in-law Raden Wijaya was given the land of Tarik timberland. He then opened the vast timberland and built a new settlement there. The village was named Majapahit, which was taken from the name of a fruit that had a bitter taste (maja is the fruit name and pahit means bitter). When the Yuan army sent by Kublai Khan arrived, Wijaya allied himself with the army to fight against Jayakatwang. Once Jayakatwang was destroyed, Raden Wijaya forced his allies to withdraw from Java by launching a surprise attack. The Yuan army had to withdraw in confusion as they were in hostile territory, with their ships being attacked by Javanese navy. It was also their last chance to catch the monsoon winds home; otherwise, they would have had to wait for another six months.

The first king, Kertarajasa Jayawardhana

In 1293, Raden Wijaya founded a stronghold with the capital Majapahit. The exact date used as the birth of the Majapahit kingdom is the day of his coronation, the 15th of Kartika month in the year 1215 using the Javanese Shaka era, which equates to 10 November 1293. During his coronation he was given the formal name Kertarajasa Jayawardhana. King Kertarajasa took all four daughters of Kertanegara as his wives, his first wife and prime queen consort Tribhuwaneswari, and her sisters; Prajnaparamita, Narendraduhita, and Gayatri Rajapatni the youngest. He also took a Sumatran Malay Dharmasraya princess named Dara Petak as his wife.

The new kingdom faced challenges. Some of Kertarajasa's most trusted men, including Ranggalawe, Sora, and Nambi rebelled against him, though unsuccessfully. It was suspected that the Mahapati Halayudha set the conspiracy to overthrow all of his rivals in the court, led them to revolt against the king, while he gained king's favour and attained the highest position in the government. However, following the death of the last rebel Kuti, Halayudha's treachery was exposed, subsequently, he was captured, jailed for his stratagems and then sentenced to death. Wijaya himself died in 1309.

Jayanegara

Kertarajasa Wijaya was succeeded by his heir Jayanegara, his son with his Malayu Dharmasraya spouse, Indreswari. The reign of Jayanegara was a difficult and chaotic one, troubled with several rebellions by his father's former companions in arms. Among others are Gajah Biru's rebellion in 1314 and the Kuti rebellion in 1319. The Kuti rebellion was the most dangerous one, as Kuti managed to take control of the capital city. With the help of Gajah Mada and his Bhayangkara palace guard, Jayanegara barely escaped from the capital and safely hid in Badander village. While the king was in hiding, Gajah Mada returned to the capital city to assess the situation. After learning that Kuti's rebellion was not supported by the people or nobles of Majapahit court, Gajah Mada raised resistance forces to crush the Kuti rebellion.

After Kuti forces were defeated, Jayanegara was safely returned to his throne. For his loyalty and excellent service, Gajah Mada was promoted to high office to begin his career in royal court politics.

According to tradition, Wijaya's son and successor, Jayanegara, was notorious for his immorality. One of his distasteful acts was his desire to take his half-sisters, Gitarja and Rajadewi, as wives. Since Javanese tradition abhorred the practice of half-siblings marrying, the council of royal elders spoke strongly against the king's wishes. It was not clear what motivated Jayanegara's wish — it might have been his way to ensure his claim to the throne by preventing rivals from being his half-sisters' suitors, although in the later period of the Majapahit court the custom of marriage among cousins was quite common. In the Pararaton, he was known as Kala Gemet, or "weak villain". Around the time of Jayanegara's reign in the early 14th century, the Italian Friar Odoric of Pordenone visited the Majapahit court in Java. He mentioned Java to be well-populated and filled with cloves, nutmeg and many other spices. He also mentioned that the king of Java had seven vassals under him and engaged in several wars with the "khan of Cathay".

In 1328, Jayanegara was murdered by his physician, Tanca, during a surgical operation. In complete mayhem and rage, Gajah Mada immediately killed Tanca. The motive behind this regicide was never clear. According to the Pararaton, it was Tanca's revenge for the king sexually abusing his wife. However, according to the Balinese manuscript Babad Dalem, the assassination was a stratagem crafted by Gajah Mada himself to rid the kingdom of an evil tyrant. Tradition mentions that the immoral, cruel and abusive king often seduced and abused women, even the wives of his own subordinates. Other possible reason includes to protect the two princesses — Gitarja and Rajadewi, the daughters of Gayatri Rajapatni from the king's cruelty. Since the slain king was childless, he left no successor.

Golden age

Queen Tribhuwana Wijayatunggadewi
 
Jayanegara's stepmother, Gayatri Rajapatni — the most revered matriarch of the court — was supposed to take the helm. However, Rajapatni had retired from worldly affairs to become a Buddhist nun. Rajapatni appointed her daughter, Dyah Gitarja, or known in her formal regnal name as Tribhuwannottungadewi Jayawishnuwardhani, as the queen of Majapahit under Rajapatni's auspices. Tribhuwana appointed Gajah Mada as the prime minister in 1336. During his inauguration Gajah Mada declared his Palapa oath, revealing his plan to expand Majapahit realm and building an empire.

During Tribhuwana's rule, the Majapahit kingdom grew much larger and became famous in the area. Under the initiative of her able and ambitious prime minister, Gajah Mada, Majapahit sent its armada to conquer the neighbouring island of Bali. According to the Babad Arya Tabanan manuscript, in 1342 Majapahit forces led by Gajah Mada, assisted by his general Arya Damar, the regent of Palembang, landed in Bali. After seven months of battles, Majapahit forces defeated the Balinese king and captured the Balinese capital of Bedulu in 1343. After the conquest of Bali, Majapahit distributed the governing authority of Bali among Arya Damar's younger brothers, Arya Kenceng, Arya Kutawandira, Arya Sentong, and Arya Belog. Arya Kenceng led his brothers to govern Bali under Majapahit suzerainty, and he would become the progenitor of the Balinese kings of the Tabanan and Badung royal houses. Through this campaign, Majapahit planted a vassal dynasty that would rule the Bali Kingdom in the following centuries. Tribhuwana ruled Majapahit until the death of her mother in 1350. She abdicated the throne in favour of her son, Hayam Wuruk.

Reign of Hayam Wuruk and Gajah Mada's conquest

Hayam Wuruk, also known as Rajasanagara, ruled Majapahit in 1350–1389. During this period, Majapahit attained its peak with the help of the prime minister Gajah Mada. Under Gajah Mada's command (1313–1364), Majapahit conquered more territories and became the regional power. According to the Nagarakretagama, canto XIII and XIV mentioned several states in Sumatra, Malay Peninsula, Borneo, Sulawesi, Nusa Tenggara islands, Maluku, New Guinea, Mindanao, Sulu Archipelago, Luzon and some parts of the Visayas islands as under the Majapahit realm of power. The Hikayat Raja Pasai, a 14th-century Aceh chronicle describe a Majapahit naval invasion on Samudra Pasai in 1350. The attacking force consisted of 400 large jong and an uncountable number of malangbang and kelulus. This expansion marked the greatest extent of Majapahit, making it one of the most influential empires in Indonesian history. It is considered a commercial trading empire in the civilisation of Asia.

In 1355, Hayam Wuruk launched the third invasion of Dayak Ma'anyan kingdom of Nan Sarunai, which at the time was led by Raden Anyan or Datu Tatuyan Wulau Miharaja Papangkat Amas. This invasion was led by Ampu Jatmika from Kalingga, Kediri with his entourage which according to Hikayat Banjar included his advisor Aria Megatsari, general Tumenggung Tatah Jiwa, minister Wiramartas, punokawan Patih Baras, Patih Basi, Patih Luhu, dan Patih Dulu, and bodyguards Sang Panimba Segara, Sang Pembelah Batung, Sang Jampang Sasak, and Sang Pengeruntung 'Garuntung' Manau. Multiple battles happened with the first battle in April 1358; killed Majapahit soldiers were burned in Tambak Wasi. Nansarunai captain Jamuhala was also killed in this battle. While prince Jarang and prince Idong hid in Man near Tabalong-kiwa river. Nansarunai soldiers were concentrated in Pulau Kadap before the second battle happened in December 1362. Casualties from this second battle were buried in Tambak in Bayu Hinrang. In this war Raden Anyan was killed, speared by Mpu Nala, and buried in Banua Lawas. In its place, Ampu Jatmika founded a Hindu kingdom state Negara Dipa under Majapahit tributary, predecessor of Banjar. While surviving Javanese, Dayak, Madurese, and Bugis soldiers, sailors, metalsmiths of this war settled in Amuntai, Alabio, and Nagara. These invasions were recorded in Dayak Ma'anyan poetry as Nansarunai Usak Jawa.

Along with launching naval and military expeditions, the expansion of the Majapahit Empire involved diplomacy and alliance. Hayam Wuruk decided, probably for political reasons, to take princess Citra Rashmi (Dyah Pitaloka) of neighbouring Sunda Kingdom as his consort. The Sundanese took this proposal as an alliance agreement. In 1357 the Sunda king and his royal family came to Majapahit to accompany and marry his daughter to Hayam Wuruk. However, Gajah Mada saw this event as an opportunity to demand Sunda's submission to Majapahit overlordship. The skirmish between the Sunda royal family and the Majapahit troops on Bubat square was inevitable. Despite courageous resistance, the royal family were overwhelmed and decimated. Almost the whole of the Sundanese royal party was killed. Tradition mentioned that the heartbroken princess committed suicide to defend the honour of her country. The Battle of Bubat, or the Pasunda Bubat tragedy, became the main theme of Kidung Sunda, also mentioned in Carita Parahyangan and Pararaton, but it was never mentioned in Nagarakretagama.

The Nagarakretagama, written in 1365, depicts a sophisticated court with refined taste in art and literature and a complex system of religious rituals. The poet describes Majapahit as the centre of a huge mandala extending from New Guinea and Maluku to Sumatra and the Malay Peninsula. Local traditions in many parts of Indonesia retain accounts of 14th-century Majapahit's power in more or less legendary form. The direct administration of Majapahit did not extend beyond east Java and Bali, but challenges to Majapahit's claim to overlordship in outer islands drew forceful responses.

To revive the fortune of Malayu in Sumatra, in the 1370s, a Malay ruler of Palembang sent an envoy to the court of the first emperor of the newly established Ming dynasty. He invited China to resume the tributary system, just like Srivijaya did several centuries earlier. Learning this diplomatic manoeuvre, immediately King Hayam Wuruk sent an envoy to Nanking, convinced the emperor that Malayu was their vassal, and was not an independent country. Subsequently, in 1377, a few years after the death of Gajah Mada, Majapahit sent a punitive naval attack against a rebellion in Palembang, contributing to the end of the Srivijayan successor kingdom. Besides Gajah Mada, Another famous military leader is was Adityawarman, known for his chronicle in Minangkabau.

The nature of the Majapahit empire and its extent is subject to debate. It may have had limited or entirely notional influence over some of the tributary states, including Sumatra, the Malay Peninsula, Kalimantan, and eastern Indonesia, over which authority was claimed in the Nagarakretagama. Geographical and economic constraints suggest that rather than a regular centralised authority, the outer states were most likely to have been connected mainly by trade connections, which were probably a royal monopoly. It also claimed relationships with Champa, Cambodia, Siam, southern Burma, and Vietnam, and even sent missions to China. Although the Majapahit rulers extended their power over other islands and destroyed neighbouring kingdoms, their focus seems to have been on controlling and gaining a larger share of the commercial trade that passed through the archipelago.

About the time Majapahit was founded, Muslim traders and proselytisers began entering the area. The Troloyo/Tralaya tomb, a remnant of Islamic cemetery compound was discovered within the Trowulan area, the royal capital of Majapahit. Experts suggest that the cemetery was used between 1368 and 1611 CE, which means Muslim traders had resided in the capital as early as the mid-14th century during the reign of Hayam Wuruk. Two Muslim tombstones in Troloyo were dated from the 14th century (1368 CE, 1376 CE). The close proximity of the site with the kraton means there were Muslim people in close relation with the court.

Decline
Following Hayam Wuruk's death in 1389, Majapahit power entered a period of decline with conflict over succession. Hayam Wuruk was succeeded by the crown princess Kusumawardhani, who married a relative, Prince Wikramawardhana. Hayam Wuruk also had a son from his previous marriage, the crown prince Wirabhumi, who also claimed the throne.

By the time of Hayam Wuruk's death, Majapahit has lost its grip on its vassal states in the northern coasts of Sumatra and Malay peninsula, the latter which according to Chinese sources, would become a tributary state of the Ayutthaya Kingdom until the rise of Malacca Sultanate, supported by the Ming dynasty.

In the 14th century a Malay Kingdom of Singapura was established, and it promptly attracted a Majapahit navy that regarded it as Tumasik, a rebellious colony. Singapura was finally sacked by Majapahit in 1398, after approximately 1 month long siege by 300 jong and 200,000 men. The last king, Sri Iskandar Shah, fled to the west coast of the Malay Peninsula to establish the Melaka Sultanate in 1400.

Regreg War 

A war of succession, called the Regreg War, is thought to have occurred from 1405 to 1406. The war was fought as a contest of succession between the western court led by Wikramawardhana and the eastern court led by Bhre Wirabhumi. Wikramawardhana was victorious. Wirabhumi was caught and decapitated. However the civil war drained financial resources, exhausted the kingdom, and weakened Majapahit's grip on its outer vassals and colonies.

Wikramawardhana and Ming expedition

During the reign of Wikramawardhana, a series of Ming armada naval expeditions led by Zheng He, a Muslim Chinese admiral, arrived in Java several times spanning the period from 1405 to 1433. These Chinese voyages visited numbers of ports in Asia as far as Africa, including Majapahit ports. It was said that Zheng He has paid a visit to the Majapahit court in Java.

These massive Chinese voyages were not merely a naval exploration, but also a show of power and a display of geopolitical reach. The Chinese Ming dynasty had recently overthrown the Mongol-led Yuan dynasty, and was eager to establish their hegemony in the world, which changed the geopolitical balance in Asia. The Chinese intervened in the politics of the southern seas by supporting Thais against the declining Khmer Empire, supporting and installing allied factions in India, Sri Lanka and other places in Indian Ocean coasts. However, perhaps the most significant Chinese intervention was its support for the newly established Sultanate of Malacca as a rival and counter-weight to the Majapahit influence of Java.

Previously, Majapahit had succeeded in asserting its influence in Malacca strait by containing the aspiration of Malay polities in Sumatra and the Malay Peninsula to ever reach the geopolitical might like those of Srivijaya. The Hindu Majapahit was the most powerful maritime power in Southeast Asian seas that time and were opposed to Chinese expansion into their sphere of influence. The Ming's support for Malacca and the spread of Islam propagated by both Malacca and Zheng He's treasure fleet has weakened Majapahit maritime influence in Sumatra, which caused the northern part of the island to increasingly converting to Islam and gained independence from Majapahit, leaving Indragiri, Jambi and Palembang, remnants of the old Srivijaya, the only suzerainty under Majapahit in Sumatra, bordering Pagaruyung Kingdom on the west and independent Muslim kingdoms on the north.

This Ming dynasty voyages are extremely important for Majapahit historiography, since Zheng He's translator Ma Huan wrote Yingya Shenglan, a detailed description of Majapahit, which provides valuable insight on the culture, customs, and also various social and economic aspects of Java during Majapahit period.

The Chinese provided systematic support to Malacca, and its sultan made at least one trip to personally pay obeisance to the Ming emperor. Malacca actively encouraged the conversion to Islam in the region, while the Ming fleet actively established Chinese-Malay Muslim community in coastal northern Java, thus created a permanent opposition to the Hindus of Java. By 1430, the expeditions had established Muslim Chinese, Arab and Malay communities in northern ports of Java such as Semarang, Demak, Tuban, and Ampel; thus Islam began to gain a foothold on the northern coast of Java. Malacca prospered under Chinese Ming protection, while the Majapahit were steadily pushed back.

Queen Suhita

Wikramawardhana ruled until 1429 and was succeeded by his daughter Suhita, who ruled from 1429 to 1447. She was the second child of Wikramawardhana by a concubine who was the daughter of Wirabhumi. She was married to future Kelantan king Iskandar Shah or Kemas Jiwa in 1427. Both of them had a daughter together and he stayed with her in Java. Kelantan was ruled by his brother, Sultan Sadik Muhammad Shah, until his death in 1429. This necessitated Kemas Jiwa to return and took the throne as Iskandar, where he declared Kelantan as Majapahit II in Mahligai. Although Pararaton listed her husband as Bhra Hyang Parameswara Ratnapangkaja, which suggests she remarried after Kemas Jiwa returned.

The reign of Suhita was the second time Majapahit was reigned by a queen regnant after her great-grandmother Tribhuwana Wijayatunggadewi. Her reign is immortalized in Javanese legend of Damarwulan, as it involves a maiden queen named Prabu Kenya in the story, and during Suhita's reign there was a war with Blambangan as stated in the legend.

In 1447, Suhita died and was succeeded by Kertawijaya, her brother. He ruled until 1451. After Kertawijaya died, Bhre Pamotan became a king with formal name Rajasawardhana. He died in 1453. A three-year kingless period was possibly the result of a succession crisis. Girisawardhana, son of Kertawijaya, came to power in 1456. He died in 1466 and was succeeded by Singhawikramawardhana.

The divide
In 1468 Prince Kertabhumi rebelled against Singhawikramawardhana, promoting himself as the king of Majapahit. Deposed Singhawikramawardhana retreated upstream of Brantas River, moved the kingdom's capital further inland to Daha (the former capital of Kediri kingdom), effectively splitting Majapahit, under Bhre Kertabumi in Trowulan and Singhawikramawardhana in Daha. Singhawikramawardhana continued his rule until he was succeeded by his son Girindrawardhana (Ranawijaya) in 1474.

And in between this period of the dividing court of Majapahit, the kingdom found itself unable to control its western part of the already crumbling empire. The rising power of the Sultanate of Malacca began to gain effective control of the Malacca Strait in the mid-15th century and expanding its influence to Sumatra. And amidst these events, Indragiri and Siantan, according to Malay Annals were given to Malacca as a dowry for the marriage of a Majapahit princess and the sultan of Malacca, further weakening Majapahit's influence on the western part of the archipelago. Kertabhumi managed to stabilize this situation by allying with Muslim merchants, giving them trading rights on the north coast of Java, with Demak as its centre and in return asked for their loyalty to Majapahit. This policy boosted the Majapahit treasury and power but weakened Hindu-Buddhism as its main religion because Islamic proselytizing spread faster, especially in Javanese coastal principalities. Hindu-Buddhist followers' grievances later paved the way for Ranawijaya to defeat Kertabumi.

Dates for the end of the Majapahit Empire range from 1478, traditionally described in sinengkalan or chandrasengkala (chronogram) Sirna ilang kertaning bhumi that is correspond to 1400 Saka, to 1527. The year 1478 was the year of Sudarma Wisuta war, when Ranawijaya's army under general Udara (who later became vice-regent) breached Trowulan defences and killed Kertabumi in his palace, but not the actual fall of Majapahit itself as a whole.

Demak sent reinforcements under Sunan Ngudung, who later died in battle and was replaced by Sunan Kudus, but they came too late to save Kertabumi although they managed to repel the Ranawijaya army. This event is mentioned in Trailokyapuri (Jiyu) and Petak inscription, where Ranawijaya claimed that he already defeated Kertabhumi and reunited Majapahit as one Kingdom. Ranawijaya ruled from 1474 to 1498 with the formal name Girindrawardhana, with Udara as his vice-regent. This event led to the war between the Sultanate of Demak and Daha since Demak rulers were descendants of Kertabhumi.

During this period, Demak, being the dominant ruler of the Javanese coastal lands and Java as a whole, seized the region of Jambi and Palembang in Sumatra from Majapahit.

Demak invasion and the fall of Majapahit

In 1498, there was a turning point when Girindrawardhana was deposed by his vice-regent, Udara. After this coup, the war between Demak and Majapahit receded, since Raden Patah, Sultan of Demak, left Majapahit alone like his father had done before, some source said Udara agreed to become a vassal of Demak, even marrying Raden Patah's youngest daughter.

Meanwhile, in the west, Malacca was captured by Portuguese in 1511. The delicate balance between Demak and Majapahit ended when Udara, seeing an opportunity to eliminate Demak, asked for Portuguese help in Malacca, forcing Demak to attack both Malacca and Majapahit under Adipati Yunus to end this alliance.

With the fall of Majapahit, crushed by Demak in 1527, the Muslim emerging forces finally defeated the remnants of the Majapahit kingdom in the early 16th century; and with the fall of Majapahit, a large number of courtiers, artisans, priests, and members of the royalty moved east to the island of Bali. The refugees fled to the east to avoid Demak retribution for their support for Ranawijaya against Kertabhumi.

Demak came under the leadership of Raden (later crowned as Sultan) Patah, who was acknowledged as the legitimate successor of Majapahit. According to Babad Tanah Jawi and Demak tradition, the source of Patah's legitimacy was because their first sultan, Raden Patah, was the son of Majapahit king Brawijaya V with a Chinese concubine. Another argument supports Demak as the successor of Majapahit; the rising Demak sultanate was easily accepted as the nominal regional ruler, as Demak was the former Majapahit vassal and located near the former Majapahit realm in eastern Java.

Demak established itself as the regional power and the first Islamic sultanate in Java. After the fall of Majapahit, the Hindu kingdoms in Java only remained in Pasuruan, Panarukan, and Blambangan on the eastern edge and Sunda Kingdom Pajajaran in the western part. Gradually Hindu communities began to retreat to the mountain ranges in East Java and also to the neighbouring island of Bali. A small enclave of Hindu communities remain in the Tengger mountain range.

Culture

The capital Trowulan, was grand and known for its great annual festivities. The main event of the administrative calendar took place on the first day of the month of Caitra (March–April) when representatives from all territories paying tax or tribute to Majapahit came to the capital to pay court. Majapahit's territories were roughly divided into three types: the palace and its vicinity; the areas of east Java and Bali which were directly administered by officials appointed by the king; and the outer dependencies which enjoyed substantial internal autonomy.

The first European record about Majapahit came from the travel log of the Italian Mattiussi, a Franciscan friar. In his book: "Travels of Friar Odoric of Pordenone", he visited several places in today's Indonesia: Sumatra, Java, and Banjarmasin in Borneo, between 1318 and 1330. He was sent by the Pope to launch a mission into the Asian interiors. In 1318 he departed from Padua, crossed the Black Sea into Persia, all the way across Calcutta, Madras, and Sri Lanka. He then headed to Nicobar island to Sumatra, before visiting Java and Banjarmasin. He returned to Italy by land through Vietnam, China, all the way through the silkroad to Europe in 1330.

In his book, he mentioned that he visited Java without explaining the exact place he had visited. He said that king of Java ruled over seven other kings (vassals). He also mentioned that in this island was found a lot of clove, cubeb, nutmeg and many other spices. He mentioned that the King of Java had an impressive, grand, and luxurious palace. The stairs and palace interior were coated with gold and silver, and even the roofs were gilded with gold. He also recorded that the Mongol emperors had repeatedly tried to attack Java, but always ended up in failure and managed to be sent back to the mainland. The Javanese kingdom mentioned in this record is Majapahit, and the time of his visit is between 1318 and 1330 during the reign of Jayanegara.

In Yingya Shenglan—a record about Zheng He's expedition (1405–1433)—Ma Huan describes the culture, customs, various social and economic aspects of Chao-Wa (Java) during Majapahit period. Ma Huan visited Java during Zheng He's 4th expedition in 1413, during the reign of Majapahit king Wikramawardhana. He describes his travel to Majapahit capital, first, he arrived at the port of Tu-pan (Tuban) where he saw large numbers of Chinese settlers migrated from Guangdong and Chou Chang. Then he sailed east to thriving new trading town of Ko-erh-hsi (Gresik), Su-pa-erh-ya (Surabaya), and then sailing inland into the river by smaller boat to the southwest until reached the river port of Chang-ku (Changgu). Continued travel by land to the southwest he arrived in Man-che-po-I (Majapahit), where the king stay. There are about 200 or 300 foreign families resides in this place, with seven or eight leaders to serve the king. The climate is constantly hot, like summer.
He describes the king's costumes; wearing a crown of gold leaves and flowers or sometimes without any headgear; bare-chested without wearing a robe, the bottom parts wears two sashes of embroidered silk. Additional silk rope is looped around the waist as a belt, and the belt is inserted with one or two short blades, called pu-la-t'ou (belati or more precisely kris dagger), walking barefoot. When travelling outside, the king rides an elephant or an ox-drawn carriage.

Commoners' clothing for men is without headgear and women arrange their hair like a bun secured with a hairpin. They wore clothing on the upper body and wrapped unstitched fabrics around the bottom part, Men from a boy aged three to elders slipped pu-la-t'ou (dagger) in their belt. The dagger, made entirely of steel with intricate motifs smoothly drawn. The handles are made of gold, rhino's horn or ivory carved with a depiction of human or demon, the carving works are exquisite and skilfully made.

Majapahit people, men and women, favoured their head. If someone was touched on his head, or if there is a misunderstanding or argument when drunk, they will instantly draw their knives and stab each other.

The population of the country did not have a bed or chair to sit and to eat they do not use a spoon or chopsticks. Men and women enjoy chewing betel nut mixed with, betel leaves, and white chalk made from ground mussels shells. They eat rice for the meal, first, they took a scoop of water and soak betel in their mouth, then wash their hands and sit down to make a circle; getting a plate of rice soaked in butter (probably coconut milk) and gravy, and eat using hands to lift the rice and put it in their mouth. When receiving guests, they will offer the guests, not the tea, but with betel nut.

The population consisted of Muslim merchants from the west (Arab and Muslim Indians, but mostly those from Muslim states in Sumatra), Chinese (claimed to be descendants of Tang dynasty), and unrefined locals. The king held annual jousting tournaments. About the marriage rituals; the groom pays a visit to the house of the bride's family, the marriage union is consummated. Three days later, the groom escorts his bride back to his home, where the man's family beat drums and brass gongs, blowing pipes made from coconut shells (senterewe), beating a drum made from bamboo tubes (probably a kind of bamboo gamelan or kolintang), and light fireworks. Escorted in front, behind, and around by men holding short blades and shields. While the bride is a matted-hair woman, with an uncovered body and barefooted. She wraps herself in embroidered silk, wears a necklace around her neck adorned with gold beads, and bracelets on her wrist with ornaments of gold, silver and other precious ornaments. Family, friends and neighbours decorate a decorative boat with betel leaf, areca nut, reeds and flowers are sewn, and arrange a party to welcome the couple on such a festive occasion. When the groom arrives home, the gong and drum are sounded, they will drink wine (possibly arrack or tuak) and play music. After a few days, the festivities end.

About the burial rituals, the dead body was left on the beach or empty land to be devoured by dogs (for lower-class), cremated, or committed into the waters (Javanese: Larung). The upper-class performed suttee, a suicide ritual by widowed wives, concubines or female servants, through self immolation by throwing themselves into flaming cremation fire.

In this record, Ma Huan also describes a musical troupe travelling during full moon nights. Numbers of people holding shoulders creating an unbroken line while singing and chanting in unison, while the families whose houses being visited would give them copper coins or gifts. He also describes a class of artisans that draws various images on paper and give a theatrical performance. The narrator tells the story of legends, tales and romance drawn upon a screen of rolled paper. This kind of performance is identified as wayang bébér, an art of story-telling that has survived for many centuries in Java.

Portuguese diplomat Tomé Pires, who visited the archipelago in 1512, recorded the culture of Java in the late Majapahit era, after his visit to the island between March–June 1513. Pires' account tells about the lords and nobles in Java. They are described as:

Religion

Buddhism, Shaivism, and Vaishnavism were all practised: the king was regarded as the incarnation of the three. The Nagarakretagama however, does not mention Islam, but there were certainly Muslim courtiers by this time.

Hinduism and Buddhism already shaped the Javanese civilisation, religion, and spiritualism since the earlier era, from the 9th century Mataram Kingdom, Kahuripan, Kadiri, to Singhasari kingdom. It seems that both Hinduism and Buddhism are widely practised by Majapahit subjects. Nevertheless, native Javanese shamanism possibly still exist and practised in peripheral rural regions.

The monarch and most of the royal family adhered to Hinduism, with certain emphasis on the cult of their own preferred main deity, either Shiva, Vishnu, Durga or other deities. The first king of Majapahit, Kertarajasa Jayawardhana was posthumously portrayed as Harihara, the god combination of Shiva and Vishnu, in his mortuary temple in Candi Simping. Mahayana Buddhism however, was also favoured by the royal family and officials of Majapahit. For example, the queen of Majapahit Gayatri Rajapatni and Gajah Mada are known as Buddhists. Gayatri later posthumously portrayed as Prajnaparamita.

The state religion however, was possibly the Siwa Buddha, the Javanese syncretism of Shaivism and Buddhism, which emphasise the similarity between Shiva and Buddha which both described as ascetics and spiritual teacher. The spiritual circumstances of Majapahit, seems to promote the harmony between the adherents of Shiva and Buddha. As demonstrated in the manuscript Sutasoma written in 14th-century by Mpu Tantular which promotes the religious tolerance between the Hinduism and Buddhism, specifically promote the syncretic Shiva-Buddha doctrine.

During the Majapahit period, religious teaching played an important role in the society. The religious education could be done individually within households of kshatriya nobles and brahmana religious elites, or in a centre for religious teaching which resembles ashram or boarding school called Mandala or Kadewaguruan. A Kadewaguruan was usually located in remote areas far from habitation places, such as quiet forest, on hills or mountainous region. A Kadewaguruan is led by a mahāresi or high priest, who is also known as śiddharesi or dewaguru; hence the education centre is called Kadewaguruan.

Literature
The literature of Majapahit was the continuation of Javanese Kawi Hindu-Buddhist scholarly tradition that produces kakawin poem that has been developed in Java since the 9th century Medang Mataram era, all the way through Kadiri and Singhasari periods. Notable Javanese literary works dated from an earlier period, such as Kadiri's 11th century Kanwa's Arjunawiwaha, 12th-century Dharmaja's Smaradahana, Sedah's Bharatayuddha, Panuluh's Hariwangsa also popular Panji cycles are continuously preserved and rewritten by Rakawi (Hindu-Buddhist poet or scholar) in Majapahit era. Notable literary works that were produced in the Majapahit period among others are Prapanca's Nagarakretagama, Tantular's Sutasoma, and Tantu Pagelaran. Popular tale of Sri Tanjung and Damarwulan also dated from Majapahit period. These Old Javanese kakawins were written and composed by Rakawis (poets) to worship the king of the gods whose incarnation the king represented.

Nagarakretagama composed by Prapanca in 1365 is a vital source of the premier historical account of Majapahit historiography. While Sutasoma is an important literature for modern Indonesian nationhood, since the national motto Bhinneka Tunggal Ika, which is usually translated as Unity in Diversity, was taken from a pupuh (canto) of this manuscript.

This quotation comes from Sutasoma canto 139, stanza 5. The full stanza reads as follows:

Rwâneka dhâtu winuwus Buddha Wiswa,
Bhinnêki rakwa ring apan kena parwanosen,
Mangka ng Jinatwa kalawan Siwatatwa tunggal,
Bhinnêka tunggal ika tan hana dharma mangrwa.

Originally, the poem was meant to promote the religious tolerance between the Hindu and Buddhist religions, specifically promote the syncretic Shiva-Buddha doctrine.

In Yingya Shenglan, Ma Huan describes the writing system used in Majapahit. For the writing, they had known the alphabet using So-li (Chola — Coromandel/Southern India) letters. There is no paper or pen, they use Chiao-chang (kajang) or palm leaf (lontar), written by scraping it with a sharp knife. They also have a developed language system and grammar.

Art

The Pala school of art of the Indian Pala Empire influenced the art and architecture of Majapahit.
Majapahit art was the continuation of East Javanese art, style and aesthetically developed since the 11th century during the Kediri and Singhasari period. Unlike the earlier naturalistic, relaxed and flowing figures of classical Central Java-style (Sailendra art c. 8th to 10th century), this East Javanese style demonstrates a stiffer pose, stylised and rendered in wayang-like figures, such as those carved on East Javanese temple's bas-reliefs. The bas-reliefs were projected rather flat from the background. This style was later preserved in Balinese art, especially in its Kamasan style classical paintings and Balinese wayang.

The statues of Hindu gods and Buddhist deities in Majapahit art were also the continuations of its previous Singhasari art. The statues of East Javanese period tends to be a stiffer and frontal-formal pose, compared to the statues of Central Javanese art (c. 9th century) that are more Indianized style, relaxed in tribhanga pose. The stiffer pose of Majapahit gods statues is probably in accordance with the statue's function as the deified portrayal self of the dead Majapahit monarch. The carving, however, is richly decorated, especially with a fine floral carving of lotus plants carved on the stela behind the statue. Examples of Majapahit statues are the Harihara statue from Simping temple, believed to be the deified portrayal of King Kertarajasa, the statue of Parwati believed to be the portrayal of Queen Tribhuwana, and a statue of the queen Suhita discovered at Jebuk, Kalangbret, Tulungagung, East Java.

Clay pottery and brick masonry are a popular feature in Majapahit art and architecture. The Majapahit Terracotta art also flourished in this period. Significant numbers of terracotta artefacts were discovered in Trowulan. The artefacts range from human and animal figurines, jars, vessels, water containers, piggy banks, bas reliefs, architectural ornaments, roof pinnacles, floor tiles, to pipes and roof tiles.

One of the most interesting findings is the Majapahit piggy bank. Several boar-shaped piggy banks have been discovered in Trowulan. It is probably the origin of Javanese-Indonesian word to refer for saving or money container. The word celengan in Javanese and Indonesian means both "savings" and "piggy bank". It was derived from the word celeng which means "wild boar", the suffix "-an" was added to denote its likeness. One important specimen is stored in the National Museum of Indonesia, it has been reconstructed since this large piggy bank has been found broken to pieces.

Terracotta money boxes also have been found in different shapes, such as tubular or boxes, with slits to slip coins. Another important terracotta artefact is the head figurine of a man popularly thought to be the depiction of Gajah Mada, although it is not certain about who was depicted in these figurines.

Architecture

In his book Yingya Shenglan, Ma Huan also describes the Majapahit cities: most of them do not have walls surrounding the city or the suburbs. He describes the king's palace in Majapahit. The king's residence is surrounded with thick red brick walls more than three chang high (about ), with length of more than 200 paces and on the wall there are two layers of gates, the palace is very well guarded and clean. The king's palace was a two-storey building, each of them 3 or 4 chang high. It had wooden plank floors and exposed mats made from rattan or reeds (presumably palm leaves), where people sat cross-legged. The roof was made of hardwood shingles (Javanese:sirap) laid as tiles.

The houses of commoners had thatched roofs (nipa palm leaves). Every family has a storage shed made of bricks, about 3 or 4 Ch'ih above the ground, where they kept the family property, and they lived on top of this building, to sit and sleep.

The Majapahit temple architecture follows the east Javanese styles, in contrast to earlier central Javanese style. This east Javanese temple style is also dated back from Kediri period c. 11th century. The shapes of Majapahit temples tend to be slender and tall, with a roof constructed from multiple parts of stepped sections formed a combined roof structure curved upward smoothly creating the perspective illussion that the temple is perceived taller than its actual height. The pinnacle of the temples are usually cube (mostly Hindu temples), sometimes dagoba cylindrical structures (Buddhist temples). Although some of the temples dated from Majapahit period used andesite or sandstone, the red bricks is also a popular construction material.

Although brick had been used in the candi of Indonesia's classical age, it was Majapahit architects of the 14th and 15th centuries who mastered it. Making use of a vine sap and palm sugar mortar, their temples had a strong geometric quality. The example of Majapahit temples are Brahu temple in Trowulan, Pari in Sidoarjo, Jabung in Probolinggo, and Surawana temple near Kediri. Jabung temple was mentioned in Nagarakretagama as Bajrajinaparamitapura, despite some parts of its roof and pinnacles are now missing, it is one of the most well-preserved Majapahit temple architecture. Another example includes Gunung Gangsir temple near Pasuruan. Some of the temples are dated from the earlier period but renovated and expanded during Majapahit era, such as Penataran, the largest temple in East Java dated back to Kediri era. This temple was identified in Nagarakretagama as Palah temple and reported being visited by King Hayam Wuruk during his royal tour across East Java. Another notable temple of Eastern Javanese style is Jawi temple in Pandaan — also visited by King Hayam Wuruk, the temple was mentioned in Nagarakretagama as Jajawa, and was dedicated as a mortuary temple for his great-grandfather, King Kertanegara of Singhasari.

Some of the typical architectural styles are believed to be developed during Majapahit era; such as tall and slender roofed red brick gate commonly called as kori agung or paduraksa, and also split gate of candi bentar. The large split gate of Wringin Lawang located at Jatipasar, Trowulan, Mojokerto, East Java, is one of the oldest and the largest surviving candi bentar dated from Majapahit era. The candi bentar took shape of typical Majapahit temple structure – consists of three parts; foot, body and tall roof — evenly split into two mirroring structures to make a passage in the centre for people to walk through. This type of split gate has no doors and provides no real defensive purpose but narrowing the passage. It probably only served the ceremonial and aesthetic purpose, to create the sense of grandeur, before entering the next compound through tall roof paduraksa gate with enclosed door. The example of kori agung or paduraksa style gate is the elegant Bajang Ratu gate richly decorated with Kala demon, cyclops and also the bas-relief telling the story of Sri Tanjung. Those typical Majapahit architectural style has deeply influenced the Javanese and Balinese architecture of later period. The current prevalence of Majapahit style pendopo pavilion, candi bentar and paduraksa gates was owed to the influence of Majapahit aesthetics on Javanese and Balinese architecture.

In later period near the fall of Majapahit, the art and architecture of Majapahit witnessed the revival of indigenous native Austronesian megalithic architectural elements, such as Sukuh and Cetho temples on western slopes of Mount Lawu. Unlike previous Majapahit temples that demonstrate typical Hindu architecture of high-rise towering structure, the shape of these temples are step pyramid, quite similar to Mesoamerican pyramids. The stepped pyramid structure called Punden Berundak (stepped mounds) is a common megalithic structure during Indonesian prehistoric era before the adoption of Hindu-Buddhist culture.

Economy
The Daoyi Zhi, which was written ca. 1339 CE, mentioned about Java's wealth and prosperity of the period:"The fields of Java are rich and its soil is level and well watered, therefore grain and rice are abundant, twice as much as in other countries. The people do not steal, and what is dropped on the road is not taken up. The common saying: "prosperous Java" means this country. Men and women wrap up their head and wear long clothes."Also in Yingya Shenglan, Ma Huan reported the Javanese economy and market. Rice is harvested twice a year, and its grain is small. They also harvest white sesame and lentils, but there is no wheat. This land produces sapan wood (useful to produce red dye), diamonds, sandalwood, incense, puyang pepper, cantharides (green beetles used for medicine), steel, turtles, tortoiseshell, strange and rare birds; such as a large parrot as big as a hen, red and green parrots, five-colored parrots, (all of them can imitate the human voice), also guinea fowl, ' bird hanging upside down ', five-coloured pigeon, peacock, 'betel tree bird', pearl bird, and green pigeons. The beasts here are strange: there are white deer, white monkey, and various other animals. Pigs, goats, cattle, horses, poultries, and there are all types of ducks, however donkeys and geese are not found.

For the fruits, there are all kinds of bananas, coconut, sugarcane, pomegranate, lotus, mang-chi-shi (manggis or mangosteen), watermelon and lang Ch'a (langsat or lanzones). Mang-chi-shi — is something like a pomegranate, peel it like an orange, it has four lumps of white flesh, sweet and sour taste and very delicious. Lang-ch'a is a fruit similar to Loquat, but larger contained three blocky white flesh with a sweet and sour taste. Sugarcane has white stems, large and coarse, with roots reaching 3 chang (30 feet 7 inches). In addition, all types of squash and vegetables are there, just a shortage of peach, plum and leek.

Taxes and fines were paid in cash. Javanese economy had been partly monetised since the late 8th century, using gold and silver coins. Previously, the 9th-century Wonoboyo hoard discovered in Central Java shows that ancient Javan gold coins were seed-shaped, similar to corn, while the silver coins were similar to buttons. In about the year 1300, in the reign of Majapahit's first king, an important change took place: the indigenous coinage was completely replaced by imported Chinese copper cash. About 10,388 ancient Chinese coins weighing about 40 kg were even unearthed from the backyard of a local commoner in Sidoarjo in November 2008. Indonesian Ancient Relics Conservation Bureau (BP3) of East Java verified that those coins dated as early as Majapahit era. The reason for using the foreign currency is not given in any source, but most scholars assume it was due to the increasing complexity of Javanese economy and a desire for a currency system that used much smaller denominations suitable for use in everyday market transactions. This was a role for which gold and silver are not well suited. These kepeng Chinese coins were thin rounded copper coins with a square hole in the centre of it. The hole was meant to tie together the money in a string of coins. These small changes—the imported Chinese copper coins—enabled Majapahit further invention, a method of savings by using a slitted earthenware coin container. These are commonly found in Majapahit ruins, the slit in the small opening to put the coins in. The most popular shape is boar-shaped celengan (piggy bank).

Some idea of the scale of the internal economy can be gathered from scattered data in inscriptions. The Canggu inscriptions dated 1358 mentions 78 ferry crossings in the country (mandala Java). Majapahit inscriptions mention a large number of occupational specialities, ranging from gold and silversmiths to drink vendors and butchers. Although many of these occupations had existed in earlier times, the proportion of the population earning an income from non-agrarian pursuits seems to have become even greater during the Majapahit era.

The great prosperity of Majapahit was probably due to two factors. Firstly, the northeast lowlands of Java were suitable for rice cultivation, and during Majapahit's prime numerous irrigation projects were undertaken, some with government assistance. Secondly, Majapahit's ports on the north coast were probably significant stations along the route to obtain the spices of Maluku, and as the spices passed through Java they would have provided an important source of income for Majapahit.

The Nagarakretagama states that the fame of the ruler of Wilwatikta (a synonym for Majapahit) attracted foreign merchants from far and wide, including Indians, Khmers, Siamese, and Chinese among others. While in the later period, Yingya Shenglan mentioned that large numbers of Chinese traders and Muslim merchants from the west (from Arab and India, but mostly from Muslim states in Sumatra and Malay peninsula) are settling in Majapahit port cities, such as Tuban, Gresik and Hujung Galuh (Surabaya). A special tax was levied against some foreigners, possibly those who had taken up semi-permanent residence in Java and conducted some type of enterprise other than foreign trade. The Majapahit Empire had trading links with Chinese Ming dynasty, Đại Việt and Champa in today Vietnam, Cambodia, Siamese Ayutthayan, Burmese Martaban and the south Indian Vijayanagara Empire.

During the Majapahit era, almost all of the commodities from Asia were found in Java. This is because of extensive shipping by the Majapahit empire using various type of ships, particularly the jong, for trading to faraway places. Ma Huan (Zheng He's translator) who visited Java in 1413, stated that ports in Java were trading goods and offer services that were more numerous and more complete than other ports in Southeast Asia.

Administration

During the reign of Hayam Wuruk, Majapahit employed a well-organised bureaucratic structure for administrative purposes. The hierarchy and structure relatively remain intact and unchanged throughout Majapahit history. The king is the paramount ruler, as the chakravartin he is considered the universal ruler and believed to be the living god on earth. The king holds the highest political authority and legitimacy.

Law and order
The law and order of Majapahit kingdom follows the regulations related to the criminal code of law which became the guidelines for people's lives at that time. This rule of law can be found in a manuscript called Kutaramanawa Dharmashastra or translated as "the Book of Religious Legislation". According to the historian Slamet Muljana's notes in the book Perundang-undangan Madjapahit (1967), there is no definite record regarding the time when this criminal law was drafted. However, based on some evidence, it can be concluded that this book of law written in old Javanese was originated from the Majapahit period during the reign of King Rajasanagara.

In Majapahit, the punishment for the crime of murder was death. According to the manuscript Kidung Sorandaka, it was said that Demung Sora, a minister of Majapahit court, was sentenced to death penalty under the Astadusta provisions for his crime on killing Mahisa Anabrang. Astadusta is a part of the Kutaramanawa Dharmashastra which regulates the punishment for murder. Overall, this criminal code consists of 19 sections that regulate various aspects of life. In addition to the punishment for the crime of murders which are summarised in the Astadusta section, there are also rules regarding buying and selling, debts, marriage, and pawnbroker. The punishments handed down included the death penalty, mutilation of the guilty body parts, fines and compensation. Additional penalties included ransom, confiscation, and money compensation for medication and drugs.

According to the Chinese description in Yingya Shenglan, when the one being stabbed was wounded and dead, the murderer will flee and hide for three days, then he will not lose his life. But if he was caught during the fight, he will instantly be stabbed to death (execution by stabbing). The country of Majapahit knows no caning for major or minor punishment. They tied the guilty men on his hands in the back with rattan rope and paraded them, and then stabbed the offender in the back where there is a floating rib which resulted in instant death. Judicial executions of this kind were frequent.

Bureaucracy officials
During his daily administration, the king is assisted by bureaucratic state officials that also included the close relatives of the kings that hold certain esteemed titles. The royal order or edict usually transmitted from the king to the high officials well to their subordinates. The officials in Majapahit courts are:
 Rakryan Mahamantri Katrini, usually reserved for the king's heir
 Rakryan Mantri ri Pakira-kiran, the board of ministers that conduct the daily administration
 Dharmmadhyaksa, the officials of laws, state laws as well as religious laws
 Dharmma-upapatti, the officials concerning religious affairs

Within the ministers of Rakryan Mantri ri Pakira-kiran there is the most important and the highest minister titled Rakryan Mapatih or Patih Hamangkubhumi. This position is analogous to prime minister, and together with the king, they determine the important state policies, including war or peace. Among the Dharmmadhyaksa officials, there is Dharmmadhyaksa ring Kasewan (State's highest Hindu Shivaist priest) and Dharmmadhyaksa ring Kasogatan (State's highest Buddhist priest), both are the authorities of the religious law of each dharmic faiths.

There is also the board of advisors which consists of the elders within the royal family called Bhattara Saptaprabhu. This council consists of seven influential elders—mostly directly related to the king. They are the Bhres (Duke or Duchess) acted as regional kings, the rulers of Majapahit provinces. This council congregates, offers advice, considered the king, and often formed an assembly to judge a certain important case in the court. Example of their office was, their sentence to temporarily suspend Mahamantri Gajah Mada, as a punishment since he was held responsible for the shamefully disastrous Bubat incident. The council also sentenced the execution of Raden Gajah (Narapati) for decapitating Bhre Wirabhumi in Regreg war.

Territorial hierarchy

Majapahit recognise the hierarchy classifications of lands within its realm:
Bhumi: the kingdom, ruled by the king
Nagara: the province, ruled by the rajya (governor), or natha (lord), or bhre (prince or duke)
Watek: the regency, administered by wiyasa,
Kuwu: the district, administered by lurah,
Wanua: the village, administered by thani,
Kabuyutan: the hamlet or sanctuary place.

During its formation, Majapahit traditional realm only consists of lesser vassal kingdoms (provinces) in eastern and central Java. This region is ruled by provincial kings called Paduka Bhattara with the title Bhre. This title is the highest position below the monarch and similar to duke or duchess. Usually, this position reserved for the close relatives of the king. They have to administer their provinces, collect taxes, send annual tributes to the capital, and manage the defences of their borders.

During the reign of Hayam Wuruk (1350–1389) there were 12 provinces of Majapahit, administered by king's close relatives:

Territorial division

When Majapahit entered the thalassocracy imperial phase during the administration of Gajah Mada, several overseas vassal states were included within the Majapahit sphere of influence, as a result, the new larger territorial concept was defined:

 Negara Agung, or the Grand State, the core kingdom. The traditional or initial area of Majapahit during its formation before entering the imperial phase. This includes the capital city and the surrounding areas where the king effectively exercises his government. The area in and around royal capital of Trowulan, the port of Canggu and sections of Brantas River valley near the capital, also mountainous areas south and southeast of the capital, all the way to Pananggungan and Arjuno-Welirang peaks, are the core realm of the kingdom. The Brantas river valley corridor, connecting Majapahit Trowulan area to Canggu and estuarine areas in Kahuripan (Sidoarjo) and Hujung Galuh port (Surabaya) are considered parts of Negara Agung.
 Mancanegara, areas surrounding Negara Agung — traditionally refer to Majapahit provinces in East and Central Java. This area covered the eastern half of Java, with all its provinces ruled by the Bhres (dukes), the king's close relatives. These areas are directly influenced by Javanese Majapahit court culture and obliged to pay annual tributes. These areas usually possess their rulers that might be directly related, foster an alliance or intermarried with the Majapahit royal family. Majapahit stationed their officials and officers in these places and regulate their foreign trade activities and collect taxes, yet they enjoyed substantial internal autonomy. This includes the rest of Java island, Madura and Bali. However, in the later period, overseas provinces which have developed culture reflected or comparable to those of Java, or possess significant trading importance, are also considered mancanegara. Either the province has its own native rulers subject (vassal) to the king, or a regent appointed and sent by the king to rule the region. This realm includes Dharmasraya, Pagaruyung, Lampung and Palembang in Sumatra.
 Nusantara, areas which do not reflect Javanese culture, but are included as colonies and they had to pay an annual tribute. They had their native polity intact, enjoyed substantial autonomy and internal freedom, and Majapahit did not necessarily station their officials or military officers here; however, any challenges on Majapahit oversight might draw a severe response. These areas such as the vassal kingdoms and colonies in Malay peninsula, Borneo, Lesser Sunda Islands, Sulawesi and Maluku.

Nagarakretagama mentioned more than 80 places in the archipelago described as the vassal states. In Canto 13, several lands on Sumatra are mentioned, and some possibly correspond to contemporary areas: Jambi, Palembang, Teba (either Tebo in Jambi or Toba areas by Lake Toba), and Dharmasraya. Also mentioned are Kandis, Kahwas, Minangkabau, Siak, Rokan, Kampar and Pane, Kampe, Haru (coastal North Sumatra, today around Medan) and Mandailing. Tamiyang (Aceh Tamiang Regency), negara Perlak (Peureulak) and Padang Lawas, are noted in the west, together with Samudra (Samudra Pasai) and Lamuri, Batan (Bintan), Lampung, and Barus. Also listed are the states of Tanjungnegara (believed to be on Borneo): Kapuas Katingan, Sampit, Kota Lingga, Kotawaringin, Sambas, and Lawas.

In Nagarakretagama Canto 14 more lands are noted: Kadandangan, Landa, Samadang, Tirem, Sedu (Sibu in Sarawak), Barune (Brunei), Kalka, Saludung (either Serudong River in Sabah or Seludong in Manila), Solot (Sulu), Pasir, Barito, Sawaku, Tabalung, and Tanjung Kutei. In Hujung Medini (Malay Peninsula), Pahang is mentioned first. Next Langkasuka, Saimwang, Kelantan and Trengganu, Johor, Paka, Muar, Dungun, Tumasik (Temasek, where Singapore is today), Kelang (Klang Valley) and Kedah, Jerai (Gunung Jerai), Kanjapiniran, all are united.

Also in Canto 14 are territories east of Java: Badahulu and Lo Gajah (part of today's Bali). Gurun and Sukun, Taliwang, Sapi (Sape town, east end of Sumbawa island, by the Sape Strait) and Dompo, Sang Hyang Api, Bima. Sheran and Hutan Kadali (Buru island). Gurun island, and Lombok Merah. Together with prosperous Sasak (central, north and east Lombok) are already ruled. Bantayan with Luwu. Further east are Udamakatraya (Sangir and Talaud). Also mentioned are Makassar, Buton, Banggai, Kunir, Galiao with Selayar, Sumba, Solot, Muar. Also Wanda(n) (Banda island), Ambon or Maluku islands, Kai Islands, Wanin (Onin peninsula, today Fakfak Regency, West Papua), Sran, Timor and other islands.

The true nature of Majapahit suzerainty is still a subject of study and even has sparked controversy. Nagarakretagama describes Majapahit as the centre of a huge mandala consists of 98 tributaries stretching from Sumatra to New Guinea. Some scholars have discounted this claim as merely a sphere of limited influence, or even just a statement of geographical knowledge.

Nevertheless, the Javanese overseas prestige and influence during the lifetime of Hayam Wuruk was undoubtedly considerable. Majapahit fleets must have periodically visited many places in the archipelago to acquire formal submission, or the splendour of Majapahit court might have attracted regional rulers to send a tribute, without any intention to submit to Majapahit's order.

All of those three categories—the Negara Agung, Mancanegara and Nusantara, were within the sphere of influence of the Majapahit empire.

The model of political formations and power diffusion from its core in the Majapahit capital city that radiates through its overseas possessions was later identified by historians as "mandala" model. The term mandala derived from Sanskrit "circle" to explain the typical ancient Southeast Asian polity that was defined by its centre rather than its boundaries, and it could be composed of numerous other tributary polities without undergoing administrative integration. The territories belongs within Majapahit Mandala sphere of influence were those categorised as Mancanegara and Nusantara. These areas usually have their indigenous rulers, enjoy substantial autonomy and have their political institution intact without further integration into Majapahit administration. The same mandala model also applied to previous empires; Srivijaya and Angkor, and also Majapahit's neighbouring mandalas; Ayutthaya and Champa.

Foreign or overseas territories are mentioned in Nagarakretagama canto 15 stanza 1. These territories include Syangka (Siam), Ayodyapura (Ayutthaya), Dharmmanagari (Ligor), Marutma (Martaban or Mergui), Rajapura (Rajpuri in the south of Siam), Singhanagari (Singhapuri on the branch of the river Menam), Campa, and Kamboja (Cambodia). The relationship between Majapahit and these territories is called kachaya, which means "to be exposed to light". It is interpreted as protected or sheltered. The term "protected area" in the modern state system is referred to as a protectorate.

In addition, in canto 83 stanza 4 and 93 stanza 1 are mentioned the places that became the origin of merchants and scholars. The regions are Jambudwipa (India), Cina, Karnataka (South India), and Goda (Gauḍa). What is different is Yawana (Arabs, see explanation), as mentioned anyat i yawana mitreka satata (the other is Yawana who is a permanent ally).

The question whether Majapahit is considered an empire or not is actually depends on the definition of the word and concept of "empire" itself. Majapahit did not performed direct administration of its overseas possessions, they did not maintain permanent military occupation, and did not imposes its political and cultural norms over a wide area; thus it is not sufficiently considered an empire in a traditional sense. However, if being an empire means the projection of military power at will, formal acknowledgement of overlordship by vassals, and the regular tribute delivery to the capital, then Java's relationship to the rest of archipelagic realm can well be considered an imperial one; thus Majapahit can be considered an empire.

In later period, Majapahit's hold on its overseas possessions began to wane. According to Waringin Pitu inscription (dated 1447) it was mentioned that Majapahit's core realm was consisted of 14 provinces, that administrated by the ruler titled Bhre. The provinces written in the inscription are:

 Daha (former capital of Kediri)
 Jagaraga
 Kabalan
 Kahuripan (or Janggala, modern Surabaya)
 Keling
 Kelinggapura
 Kembang Jenar
 Matahun (today Bojonegoro)
 Pajang (today Surakarta)
 Singhapura
 Tanjungpura
 Tumapel (former capital of Singhasari)
 Wengker (today Ponorogo)
 Wirabhumi (today Blambangan)

The inscription, however, did not mention Majapahit's vassals in other areas around the period, such as:
 Indragiri in Sumatra and Siantan (now in Pontianak in the west coast of Borneo), which according to the Malay Annals, were given as a dowry to Malacca for the marriage of a Majapahit princess and Mansur Shah sometime during his reign. Sultan Mansur Shah reigned from 1459 to 1477, which implies that Indragiri and Siantan were both still under Majapahit's control in 1447.
 Jambi and Palembang, which only ceased to be under Majapahit suzerainty when seized by Demak.
 And Bali, which were known to be the last stronghold of the Hindu-Javanese civilization during Majapahit's downfall.

Military
The army of Majapahit was divided into 2 main types, namely prajurit (professional soldier) and levy taken up from peasants. The main weapon was the spear. Cavalry exist in limited numbers, were mainly used for scouting and patrol, and were probably mainly armed with lances. After the Mongol invasion, the use of horses became more widespread in Java, especially for war. Chariots are used for transporting the soldiers to the battlefield. War elephants were used mainly for transport, or as a mount for nobility and soldiers of higher rank.

Gunpowder technology entered Java in the Mongol invasion of Java (1293 A.D.). Majapahit under Mahapatih (prime minister) Gajah Mada utilized gunpowder technology obtained from the Yuan dynasty for use in the naval fleet. During the following years, the Majapahit army have begun producing cannons known as cetbang. Early cetbang (also called eastern-style cetbang) resembled Chinese cannons and hand cannons. Eastern-style cetbangs were mostly made of bronze and were front-loaded cannons. It fires arrow-like projectiles, but round bullets and co-viative projectiles can also be used. These arrows can be solid-tipped without explosives, or with explosives and incendiary materials placed behind the tip. Near the rear, there is a combustion chamber or room, which refers to the bulging part near the rear of the gun, where the gunpowder is placed. The cetbang is mounted on a fixed mount, or as a hand cannon mounted on the end of a pole. There is a tube-like section on the back of the cannon. In the hand cannon-type cetbang, this tube is used as a socket for a pole.

Because of the close maritime relations of the Nusantara archipelago with the territory of west India, after 1460 new types of gunpowder weapons entered the archipelago through Arab intermediaries. This weapon seems to be cannon and gun of Ottoman tradition, for example the prangi, which is a breech-loading swivel gun. It resulted in a new type of cetbang, called "western-style cetbang". It can be mounted as a fixed or swivel gun, small-sized ones can be easily installed on small vessels. In naval combat, this gun is used as an anti-personnel weapon, not anti-ship. In this age, even to the 17th century, Nusantaran soldiers fought on a platform called balai and performed boarding actions. Loaded with scatter shots (grapeshot, case shot, or nails and stones) and fired at close range, the cetbang would have been effective at this type of fighting.

Majapahit had elite troops called Bhayangkara. The main task of these troops is for protecting the king and nobilities, but they may also be deployed to the battlefield if required. The Hikayat Banjar noted the Bhayangkara equipments in the Majapahit palace:

Maka kaluar dangan parhiasannya orang barbaju-rantai ampat puluh sarta padangnya barkupiah taranggos sakhlat merah, orang mambawa astenggar ampat puluh, orang mambawa parisai sarta padangnya ampat puluh, orang mambawa dadap sarta sodoknya sapuluh, orang mambawa panah sarta anaknya sapuluh, yang mambawa tumbak parampukan barsulam amas ampat puluh, yang mambawa tameng Bali bartulis air mas ampat puluh.
So came out with their ornaments men with chain mail numbered forty alongside their swords and red kopiah [skull cap], men carrying astengger [arquebus] numbered forty, men carrying shield and swords numbered forty, men carrying dadap [a type of shield] and sodok [broad-bladed spear-like weapon] numbered ten, men carrying bows and arrows numbered ten, (men) who carried parampukan spears embroidered with gold numbered forty, (men) who carried Balinese shields with golden water engraving numbered forty.— Hikayat Banjar, 6.3

Military forces in various parts of Southeast Asia were lightly armored. As was common in Southeast Asia, most of the Javanese forces were composed of temporarily conscripted commoners (levy) led by the warrior and noble castes. The "peasant army" was usually bare-chested wearing a sarung, armed with spear, short sword, or bow and arrows. The richer (higher rank) soldiers wore armor called kawaca. Irawan Djoko Nugroho argues that it may be shaped like a long tube and was made of cast copper. In contrast, the common infantry wore a scale armor called siping-siping. Other kinds of armor used in Majapahit-era Java was waju rante (chain mail armor) and karambalangan (a layer of metal worn in front of the chest). In Kidung Sunda canto 2 stanza 85 it is explained that the mantris (ministers or officers) of Gajah Mada wore armor in the form of chain mail or breastplate with gold decoration and dressed in yellow attire, while Kidung Sundayana canto 1 stanza 95 mentioned that Gajah Mada wore golden embossed karambalangan, armed with gold-layered spear, and with a shield full of diamond decoration.

Majapahit also pioneered the use of firearm in the archipelago. Even though the knowledge of making gunpowder-based weapons has been known after the failed Mongol invasion of Java, and the predecessor of firearms, the pole gun (bedil tombak) was recorded as being used by the Javanese for marriage ceremony in 1413, the knowledge of making "true" firearms came much later, after the middle of the 15th century. It was brought by the Islamic nations of West Asia, most probably the Arabs. The precise year of introduction is unknown, but it may be safely concluded to be no earlier than 1460.

Tomé Pires' 1513 account tells the army of Gusti Pati (Patih Udara), viceroy of Batara Vojyaya (probably Brawijaya or Ranawijaya), numbered 200,000 men, 2,000 of which are horsemen and 4,000 musketeers. Duarte Barbosa ca. 1514 recorded that the inhabitants of Java are great masters in casting artillery and very good artillerymen. They make many one-pounder cannons (cetbang or rentaka), long muskets, spingarde (arquebus), schioppi (hand cannon), Greek fire, guns (cannons), and other fire-works. Every place is considered excellent in casting artillery, and in the knowledge of using it.

The first true cavalry (organized units of cooperative horsemen) in Java may have appeared during the 12th century CE. The old Javanese manuscript kakawin Bhomāntaka mentioned early Javanese horse lore and horsemanship. The manuscript may reflect the conflict (allegorically) between the newly formed Javanese cavalry and the well-established elite infantry of Javanese armies. In the 14th century CE, Java became an important horse breeder and the island was even listed among horse suppliers to China. During the Majapahit period, the quantity and quality of Javanese horse breeds steadily grew. In 1513 CE Tomé Pires praised the highly decorated horses of Javanese nobility, complemented by gold-studded stirrups and lavishly decorated saddles that were "not found anywhere else in the world". The Sumbawa pony seems to have been derived from the Javanese domesticated horse introduced by Majapahit in 14th century CE.

Majapahit had a naval troops that was distinguished from ground troop units, which was called wwang jaladhi. Naval troops get preferential treatment in terms of facilities. Majapahit navy personnel were large, as noted Nagarakretagama canto 16 stanza 5:








The main warship of the Majapahit navy was the jong. The jongs were large transport ships that could carry 100–2000 tons of cargo and 50–1000 people. They are about 26.36–80.51 m in LOD (deck length) and 28.99–88.56 m in LOA (overall length). A jong from 1420 nearly crossed the Atlantic Ocean. A type of large nine-decked jong that was recorded in Kidung Panji Wijayakrama-Rangga Lawe (c. 1334) was called jong sasangawangunan, it carried 1000 fighting men with red sails. The exact number of jong fielded by Majapahit is unknown, but the largest number of jong deployed in an expedition was about 400 jongs when Majapahit attacked Pasai. The average jong used by Majapahit would be about 76.18–79.81 m LOA, carrying 600–700 men, with 1200–1400 tons deadweight. Before the Battle of Bubat in 1357, the Sunda king and the royal family arrived in Majapahit after sailing across the Java Sea in a fleet of 200 large ships and 2000 smaller vessels. The royal family boarded a nine-decked hybrid Sino-Southeast Asian junk (Old Javanese: Jong sasanga wangunan ring Tatarnagari tiniru). This hybrid junk incorporated Chinese techniques, such as using iron nails alongside wooden dowels, the construction of watertight bulkheads, and the addition of a central rudder. Besides that, other types of vessels used by Majapahit navy are malangbang, kelulus, pelang, jongkong, cerucuh, and tongkang. In the 16th century lancaran and penjajap are also used. Modern depictions of the Majapahit navy often depict outrigger ships, in reality, these ships were from 8th century Borobudur ship bas relief. Research by Nugroho concluded that the main vessels used by Majapahit did not use outriggers, and using Borobudur engraving as the basis for reconstructing Majapahit ship is wrong.

Explorations and navigation 
During Majapahit era Nusantaran exploration reached its greatest accomplishment. Ludovico di Varthema (1470–1517), in his book Itinerario de Ludouico de Varthema Bolognese stated that the Southern Javanese people sailed to "far Southern lands" up to the point they arrived at an island where a day only lasted four hours long and was "colder than in any part of the world". Modern studies have determined that such place is located at least 900 nautical miles (1666 km) south of the southernmost point of Tasmania.

The Javanese people, like other Austronesian ethnicities, use a solid navigation system: Orientation at sea is carried out using a variety of different natural signs, and by using a very distinctive astronomy technique called "star path navigation". Basically, the navigators determine the bow of the ship to the islands that are recognized by using the position of rising and setting of certain stars above the horizon. In the Majapahit era, compasses and magnets were used, and cartography (mapping science) was developed. In 1293 CE Raden Wijaya presented a map and census record to the Yuan Mongol invader, suggesting that mapmaking has been a formal part of governmental affair in Java. The use of maps full of longitudinal and transverse lines, rhumb lines, and direct route lines traveled by ships were recorded by Europeans, to the point that the Portuguese considered the Javanese maps were the best map in the early 1500s.

When Afonso de Albuquerque conquered Malacca (1511), the Portuguese recovered a chart from a Javanese maritime pilot, which already included part of the Americas. Regarding the chart Albuquerque said:"...a large map of a Javanese pilot, containing the Cape of Good Hope, Portugal and the land of Brazil, the Red Sea and the Sea of Persia, the Clove Islands, the navigation of the Chinese and the Gom, with their rhumbs and direct routes followed by the ships, and the hinterland, and how the kingdoms border on each other. It seems to me. Sir, that this was the best thing I have ever seen, and Your Highness will be very pleased to see it; it had the names in Javanese writing, but I had with me a Javanese who could read and write. I send this piece to Your Highness, which Francisco Rodrigues traced from the other, in which Your Highness can truly see where the Chinese and Gores come from, and the course your ships must take to the Clove Islands, and where the gold mines lie, and the islands of Java and Banda."

— Letter of Albuquerque to King Manuel I of Portugal, 1 April 1512.

Relations with regional powers

For several centuries — since the era of Srivijaya and Medang Mataram (circa 10th century), the classic rivalry between Sumatran Malay states and Javanese kingdoms has shaped the dynamics of geopolitics in the region.
Their activities in guarding the sea in pursuit of their economic interest, plus their military activities to safeguard this interests, has led to conflicts between Malays and Javanese. Since early of its formation, Majapahit inherited the foreign outlook of its predecessor entity – Singhasari kingdom, in which its last king Kertanegara projected his influence abroad by launching Pamalayu expedition (1275–1293) to incorporate Malay polities in Sumatra and Malay Peninsula within Javanese sphere of influence. Previously, Singhasari seeks to dominate trade route, especially Malacca strait, and also saw the outreach of Mongolian-Chinese Yuan influence into Southeast Asia as the threat to their interest. During its formation, the returning Pamalayu expedition in 1293 has brought Malayu Kingdoms in Jambi and Dharmasraya under Javanese suzerainty. Therefore, Java often considers itself as the overlord of most of the polities in the Indonesian archipelago.

During the reign of Majapahit's first two monarch — Wijaya and Jayanegara, the kingdom struggled to consolidate its rule, plagued by several rebellions. However, it was not until the reign of its third monarch — Queen Tribhuwana Tunggadewi, and her son, Hayam Wuruk — that the kingdom began to project its power overseas. Majapahit's confidence for dominance was stemmed for their economic and demographic comparative advantage; agrarian as well as a maritime nation; their large rice production, immense human resources, well-organized society, also their mastery in shipbuilding, navigation and military technology; are excellent relatively compared to their neighbours. These strengths were used by Gajah Mada to expand the kingdom's influence and building a maritime empire. This rather imperialistic outlook has projected in the way he forcefully dealt with Majapahit's neighbours; the Pabali (conquest of Bali, 1342–1343) and the Pasunda Bubat (1356). Majapahit pulled Bali into their orbit as a vassal state. While the disastrous diplomacy with the Sunda kingdom has led to the enmity among them.

Majapahit overlordship upon Malay states of Sumatra was demonstrated by the rule of Adityawarman of Malayupura. Adityawarman, the cousin of King Jayanegara, was raised within Majapahit palace and rose to become a senior minister in Majapahit court. He was sent to led Majapahit military expansion to conquer east coast region in Sumatra. Adityawarman then founded the royal dynasty of Minangkabau in Pagarruyung and presided over the central Sumatra region to take control of the gold trade between 1347 and 1375.

Within Indonesian archipelago, Majapahit saw itself as the centre of a huge mandala. This notion is demonstrated by its three-tier administrative hierarchy; Nagara Agung, Mancanegara, and Nusantara.

In Sumatran front, Majapahit did capture Palembang, Jambi and Dharmasraya, invade Pasai, and it also saw the settlement of Tumasik, that later become Kingdom of Singapura, as its rebellious colony, and thus deal with them accordingly.

In later years after the era of Hayam Wuruk, Majapahit has lost their grips on some of their overseas possessions. This led to the thrive and the rise of several polities previously held under Majapahit domination, such as Brunei and Malacca. The rise of Malacca in the 15th century, in particular, is important, because it represents Majapahit eventual failure to control Malacca strait. Previously Majapahit tried to contain the rise of a potential regional rival; a Malay polity in par with Srivijaya, by punishing a rebellion in Palembang and capturing Singapura. In this sense, Malacca was indeed the rival of Majapahit in the competition to dominate the archipelagic realm. Despite this perceived rivalry, in practice, however, the two kingdoms had some close and intense economic and cultural relations. At that time, the trade link between Majapahit ports of Hujung Galuh and Tuban with the port of Melaka must be thriving.

Majapahit true rival for domination, however, was the powerful Ming Chinese. After the fall of Yuan, the Ming Emperor eager to project his power into Southeast Asia. On the other hand, Majapahit saw this archipelagic realm as theirs and unwelcome to any perceived Chinese interference. After Majapahit was weakened by Paregreg civil war, and incessant conflicts among its nobles, the arrival of the formidable Ming treasure voyages led by Zheng He upon Majapahit shores has pushed Majapahit prestige and power to the side. Ming on the other hand, actively support the rise of Malacca. This Ming protection has made Majapahit unwilling and unable to push Malacca anymore.

Majapahit ultimate nemesis, however, was located very close at home; the Demak Sultanate on the northern coast of Central Java. Ming support to Malacca, and Malacca active proselytizing of Islam, has led to the thriving and rise of Muslim traders community in the archipelago, including in Majapahit ports on the north coast of Java. This in turn gradually corroded the prestige of Javanese Hindu-Buddhist kingship, and after several generations, led to the fall of once-mighty Majapahit empire.

Legacy

Majapahit was the largest empire ever to form in Southeast Asia. Although its political power beyond the core area in east Java was diffuse, constituting mainly ceremonial recognition of suzerainty, Majapahit society developed a high degree of sophistication in both commercial and artistic activities. Its capital was inhabited by a cosmopolitan population among whom literature and art flourished.

Numbers of local legends and folklores in the region had mentioned about the Majapahit kingdom. Other than Javanese sources, some regional legends mentioning Majapahit kingdom or its general Gajah Mada also can be found; from Aceh, Minangkabau, Palembang, Malay Peninsula, Sunda, Brunei, Bali to Sumbawa. Most of them mentioned about the incoming Javanese forces to their land, which was probably a local testament of the empire's expansive nature that once dominating the archipelago. The Hikayat Raja Pasai, a 14th-century Aceh chronicle tell a Majapahit naval invasion against Samudra Pasai in 1350. The chronicle described that the Majapahit invasion was a punishment for Sultan Ahmad Malik Az-Zahir's crime on ruining a royal marriage between Pasai Prince Tun Abdul Jalil and Raden Galuh Gemerencang, a Majapahit princess — that led to the death of the royal couple. 

In West Sumatra, the legend of Minangkabau mentioned an invading foreign prince — associated with Javanese Majapahit kingdom — being defeated in a buffalo fight. In West Java, the Pasunda Bubat tragedy caused a myth to revolve around Indonesians, which forbids marriage between a Sundanese and a Javanese, as it would be unsustainable and only bring misery to the couple. In Malay peninsula, the Malay annals mentioned the legend of the fall of Singapura to Majapahit forces in 1398 was due to the betrayal of Sang Rajuna Tapa that opened the fortified city gate. In Brunei, the folk legend of Lumut Lunting and Pilong-Pilongan islands in Brunei Bay also connected to Majapahit.

Several Javanese legends were originated or become popular during the Majapahit period. The Panji cycles, the tale of Sri Tanjung, and the epic of Damarwulan, are popular tales in Javanese and Balinese literatures. The tales of Panji was dated from the older period during Kediri kingdom, while the tale of Sri Tanjung and the epic of Damarwulan took place during the Majapahit period. These tales remained a popular theme in Javanese culture of later period during Mataram Sultanate, and often became the source of inspiration for wayang shadow puppet performance, ketoprak and topeng dance drama. The Panji tales, in particular, have spread from East Java to become a source of inspiration for literature and dance drama throughout the region, as far as Malay peninsula, Cambodia and Siam where he is known as Raden Inao or Enau of Kurepan.

Majapahit had a momentous and lasting influence on Indonesian art and architecture. The empire's expansion circa 14th-century contributed to the diffusion Javanese cultural influence throughout the archipelago, which can be seen as a form of Javanisation. It was probably during this period that some of the Javanese cultural elements, such as gamelan and kris, being expanded and introduced to islands outside of Java. The descriptions of the architecture of the capital's pavilions (pendopo) in the Nagarakretagama evoke the Javanese Kraton also the Balinese temples and palace compounds of today. The Majapahit architectural style that often employs terracotta and red brick heavily influenced the architecture of Java and Bali in the later period. The Majapahit style candi bentar split gate, the kori or paduraksa towering red-brick gate, and also pendopo pavilion have become ubiquitous in Javanese and Balinese architectural features, as seen in Menara Kudus Mosque, Keraton Kasepuhan and Sunyaragi park in Cirebon, Mataram Sultanate royal cemetery in Kota Gede, Yogyakarta, and various palaces and temples in Bali.

The vivid, rich and festive Balinese culture is considered one of Majapahit's legacy. The Javanese Hindu civilisation since the era of Airlangga to the era of Majapahit kings has profoundly influenced and shaped the Balinese culture and history. The ancient links and Majapahit legacy is observable in many ways; architecture, literature, religious rituals, dance-drama and artforms. The aesthetics and style of bas-reliefs in Majapahit East Javanese temples were preserved and copied in Balinese temples. It is also because, after the fall of the empire, many Majapahit nobles, artisans and priests had taken refuge either in the interior mountainous region of East Java or across the narrow strait to Bali. Indeed, in some ways, the Kingdom of Bali was the successor of Majapahit. Large numbers of Majapahit manuscripts, such as Nagarakretagama, Sutasoma, Pararaton and Tantu Pagelaran, were being well-kept in royal libraries of Bali and Lombok and provides the glimpse and valuable historical records on Majapahit. The Majapahit Hindu-Javanese culture has shaped the culture of Bali, that led to popular expression; "without Java, there is no Bali". Yet in return, Bali is credited as the last stronghold to safeguard and preserve the ancient Hindu Javanese civilisation.

In weaponry, the Majapahit expansion is believed to be responsible for the widespread use of the keris dagger in Southeast Asia; from Java, Bali, Sumatra, Malaysia, Brunei to Southern Thailand. Although it has been suggested that the keris, and native daggers similar to it, predate Majapahit, nevertheless the empire expansion contributed to its popularity and diffusion in the region around the year 1492. For example, Kris of Knaud, one of the oldest surviving kris is dated to 1264 Saka (which correspondents to 1342). The Malay legend of Kris Taming Sari is also attributed to Majapahit origin.

For Indonesians in later centuries, Majapahit became a symbol of past greatness. The Islamic sultanates of Demak, Pajang, and Mataram sought to establish their legitimacy to the Majapahit. The Demak claimed a line of succession through Kertabumi, as its founder Raden Patah, in court chronicles was said to be the son of Kertabumi with Putri Cina, a Chinese princess, who had been sent away before her son was born. Sultan Agung's conquest of Wirasaba (present-day Mojoagung) in 1615—during that time just a small town without significant strategic and economic value—led by the sultan himself, may probably have had such symbolic importance as it was the location of the former Majapahit capital. Central Javanese palaces have traditions and genealogy that attempt to prove links back to the Majapahit royal lines—usually in the form of a grave as a vital link in Java – where legitimacy is enhanced by such a connection. Bali, in particular, was heavily influenced by Majapahit and the Balinese consider themselves to be the true heirs of the kingdom.

Modern Indonesian nationalists, including those of the early 20th-century Indonesian National Revival, have invoked the Majapahit Empire. Indonesian founding fathers—especially Sukarno and Mohammad Yamin, built a historical construct around Majapahit to argue for the ancient unified realm, as a predecessor of modern Indonesia. The memory of its greatness remains in Indonesia and is sometimes seen as a precedent for the current political boundaries of the Republic. Many of modern Indonesian national symbols derived from Majapahit Hindu-Buddhist elements. The Indonesian national motto, "Bhinneka Tunggal Ika", is a quotation from an Old Javanese poem "Kakawin Sutasoma", written by a Majapahit poet, Mpu Tantular.

The Indonesian coat of arms, Garuda Pancasila, also derives from Javanese Hindu elements. The statue and relief of Garuda have been found in many temples in Java such as Prambanan from the ancient Mataram era, and the Panataran as well as the Sukuh temple dated from the Majapahit era. The notable statue of Garuda is the statue of the king Airlangga depicted as Vishnu riding Garuda.

In its propaganda from the 1920s, the Communist Party of Indonesia presented its vision of a classless society as a reincarnation of a romanticised Majapahit. It was invoked by Sukarno for nation building and by the New Order as an expression of state expansion and consolidation. Like Majapahit, the modern state of Indonesia covers vast territory and is politically centred on Java.

Palapa, the series of communication satellites owned by Telkom Indonesia, an Indonesian telecommunication company, was named after Sumpah Palapa, the famous oath taken by Gajah Mada, who swore that he would not taste any spice as long as he had not succeeded in unifying Nusantara (Indonesian archipelago). This ancient oath of unification signifies the Palapa satellite as the modern means to unify the Indonesian archipelago by way of telecommunication. The name was chosen by the president Suharto, and the program was started in February 1975.

Pura Kawitan Majapahit was built in 1995 as a homage to honour the empire that inspires the nation. Majapahit is often regarded as the antecedent of the modern state of Indonesia. This Hindu temple complex is located within Trowulan just north of Segaran pool.

During the last half-year of 2008, the Indonesian government sponsored a massive exploration on the site that is believed to be the place where the palace of Majapahit once stood. Jero Wacik, the Indonesian Minister of Culture and Tourism stated that the Majapahit Park would be built on the site and completed as early as 2009, to prevent further damage caused by home-made brick industries that developed in the surrounding area. Nevertheless, the project leaves a huge attention to some historians, since constructing the park's foundation in Segaran site located in south side of Trowulan Museum will inevitably damage the site itself. Ancient bricks which are historically valuable were found scattered on the site. The government then argued that the method they were applying were less destructive since digging method were used instead of drilling.

List of rulers

The rulers of Majapahit was the dynastic continuity of the Singhasari kings, which started by Sri Ranggah Rajasa, the founder of Rajasa dynasty in the late 13th century.

Family tree

Majapahit in popular culture

Celebrated as 'the golden era of the archipelago', the Majapahit empire has inspired many writers and artists (and continues to do so) to create their works based on this era or to describe and mention it. The impact of the Majapahit theme on popular culture can be seen in the following:

 Sandyakalaning Majapahit (1933), or Twilight/Sunset in Majapahit is a historical romance that took place during the fall of Majapahit empire, written by Sanusi Pane.
 Panji Koming (since 1979), a weekly comic strip by Dwi Koendoro published in the Sunday edition of Kompas, telling the everyday life of Panji Koming, a common Majapahit citizen. Although it took place in the Majapahit era, the comic strip serves as witty satire and criticism of modern Indonesian society. From a political, social, cultural and current point of view, Indonesia is described as the 'reincarnation' of the Majapahit empire. The current Indonesian president is often portrayed as a Majapahit monarch or prime minister.
 Saur Sepuh (1987–1991), a radio drama and film by Niki Kosasih. Begun as a popular radio drama program in the late 1980s, Saur Sepuh is based on 15th-century Java, centred around the story about a fictional hero named Brama Kumbara, the king of Madangkara, a fictional kingdom neighbour of the Pajajaran. In several stories the Paregreg war is described, that is to say, the civil war of Majapahit between Wikramawardhana and Bhre Wirabhumi. This part has been made into a single feature film entitled 'Saur Sepuh' as well.
 Tutur Tinular, a radio drama and film by S Tidjab. Tutur Tinular is a martial art historical epic fictional story with the Majapahit era serving as the background of the story. The story also involved a romance between the hero named Arya Kamandanu and his Chinese lover Mei Shin.
 Wali Songo, the film tells the story of nine Muslim saints ('wali') who spread Islam to Java. The story took place near the end of the Majapahit era and the formation of Demak. It describes the decaying Majapahit empire where royals are fighting each other for power while the commoners suffer.
 Senopati Pamungkas (1986, reprinted in 2003), a martial art-historical epic novel by Arswendo Atmowiloto. It takes place in the late Singhasari period and formation of Majapahit. This novel describes the sagas, royal intrigues, and romance of the formation of the kingdom as well as the adventure of the main character, a commoner named Upasara Wulung and his forbidden love affair with princess Gayatri Rajapatni, whom later becomes the consort of Raden Wijaya, the first king of Majapahit.
  Imperium Majapahit, a comic book series by Jan Mintaraga, published by Elexmedia Komputindo. This series tells the history of Majapahit from its formation until the decline.
 Puteri Gunung Ledang (2004), a Malaysian epic film based on a traditional Malay legend. This film recounts the love story between Gusti Putri Retno Dumilah, a Majapahit princess, and Hang Tuah, a Malaccan admiral.
 Gajah Mada, a pentalogy written by Langit Kresna Hariadi depicting a fictionalised detail of Gajah Mada's life from the Kuti rebellion up to the Bubat War.
 Dyah Pitaloka (2007), a novel written by Hermawan Aksan, fictionalising the detailed life story of Sundanese princess Dyah Pitaloka Citraresmi set around the Bubat War. The novel virtually takes the same context and was inspired by the Kidung Sundayana.
 Jung Jawa (2009), an anthology of short stories written by Rendra Fatrisna Kurniawan, imagining the life of the Nusantara people, published by Babel Publishing.
 Civilization 5: Brave New World (2013), where Gajah Mada appeared as one of the leaders of a great civilisation in the second expansion of the Civilization 5 game. He is the leader of the Indonesian civilisation, with the emblem of the Indonesian empire being the Surya Majapahit, although in the game the empire is known as the "Indonesian empire" instead.
 Later, in Civilization 6 (2016), a downloadable content has one of its rulers, Dyah Gitarja (referred as Gitarja in-game) as the leader of the Indonesian civilization, with the emblem being a simpler version of the Surya Majapahit. The unique unit of Indonesian civilization is the jong.
 On the Rise of the Rajas expansion pack from Age of Empires II, Gajah Mada appears in a campaign detailing his rise and then fall after the Pasunda Bubat tragedy. He also made appearance in the Age of Empires II: Definitive Edition.
 A unit called Cetbang Cannon is available for Indonesia, a revolutionary nation available for the Dutch and Portuguese civilization in Age of Empires III: Definitive Edition.
 In a popular YouTube video called "History of the Entire World, I Guess," the brief segment showcasing the Majapahit features the video's narrator and creator, Bill Wurtz, comically mispronouncing "Majapahit" in rapid succession ("It's the Mahajapit...Majahapit...Mapajahit...Mahapajit...Mapajahit") before settling on the correct pronunciation.

See also

 Gosari inscription
 Indonesian Esoteric Buddhism
 Javanese Kshatriya
 Kidung Sunda
 List of monarchs of Java
 Osing
 Srivijaya
 Tenggerese
 Hinduism in Indonesia
 Hinduism in Java
 Bali

Notes

References

Bibliography

External links

 A Short History of Majapahit
 Memoirs of Majapahit Kingdom
 A brief history of Majapahit 
 A Complete Transcription of Majapahit Royal Manuscript of Nagarakertagama from SejarahNasional.org an National History Website, adapted from Muljana, Slamet (1979). Nagarakretagama dan Tafsir Sejarahnya. Bhratara Karya Aksara.

 
1527 disestablishments in Asia
States and territories established in 1293
States and territories disestablished in 1527
Historical Hindu empires
Precolonial states of Indonesia
1293 establishments in Asia
Former countries in Malaysian history
Former empires in Asia
Former countries in Indonesian history
Hindu Buddhist states in Indonesia
Former countries in Thai history
13th century in Thailand
Island countries
Indianized kingdoms
Former countries
Former monarchies
Majapahit